William Henry Seaman (November 15, 1842March 8, 1915) was an American lawyer and judge from Wisconsin.  He served as a United States federal judge for 22 years, first in the Eastern District of Wisconsin, then on the Seventh Circuit.

Early life and education

William Henry Seaman was born in New Berlin, Wisconsin Territory, on November 15, 1842. His father, William Seaman, had brought the family to the Wisconsin Territory from Buffalo, New York, the previous year.  His mother, Arelisle (Crane) Seaman, was descended from some of the earliest Puritan settlers at the Massachusetts Bay Colony.  His paternal grandfather, Williams Seaman, was a Democratic state senator in the New York State Legislature.

His father had intended to bring goods to the territory and set up a store, but the supplies were lost in a shipwreck.  Instead, they settled in what was then western Milwaukee County and built a saw mill and log cabin, where our William H. Seaman was born.  Unfortunately, in the winter after his birth, the saw mill burned down and the family had to relocate again.  This time they moved to village of Milwaukee, where his father became a harness maker.  The next year they moved to Ceresco, and finally, in 1845, to Sheboygan, where his father was finally able to prosper as a merchant.

Seaman was educated in the public schools of Sheboygan until age 16, when he began working as a printer.  He began studying law under Crosby W. Ellis in the nights after work, but his studies were interrupted by the outbreak of the American Civil War.

Civil War service

On September 19, 1861, Seaman volunteered for service in the Union Army and was enrolled as a private in Company H, 1st Wisconsin Volunteer Infantry Regiment.  After a year, he was promoted to Corporal, and eventually Sergeant.  When the regiment mustered out in October 1864, Sergeant Seaman continued his service as a quartermaster on the staff of General George Henry Thomas through the end of the war.

Legal career

Seaman returned to Sheboygan in September 1866, and resumed his legal studies under the tutelage of state senator John A. Bentley.  In June 1868, Seaman was admitted to the State Bar of Wisconsin and entered into a partnership with Bentley, forming the law firm Bentley & Seaman.  The partnership continued until 1876, when Bentley was appointed United States Pension Commissioner.  Seaman subsequently partnered with Francis Williams, in 1882, in the firm Seaman & Williams, which endured for the next eleven years.

Seaman served in many local offices, including city council, school board, and, in 1881, he was elected Mayor of Sheboygan.  He was a staunch Democrat, was chosen as chairman of the 1888 Wisconsin Democratic Party convention, and was a delegate for Wisconsin to the 1888 Democratic National Convention.  In 1891, he was appointed to the Board of Regents of the University of Wisconsin.

Federal judicial service

Seaman was nominated by President Grover Cleveland on March 27, 1893, to a seat on the United States District Court for the Eastern District of Wisconsin vacated by Judge James Graham Jenkins. He was confirmed by the United States Senate on April 3, 1893, and received his commission the same day. His service terminated on March 1, 1905, due to his elevation to the Seventh Circuit.

Seaman was nominated by President Theodore Roosevelt on February 25, 1905, to a joint seat on the United States Court of Appeals for the Seventh Circuit and the United States Circuit Courts for the Seventh Circuit vacated by Judge James Graham Jenkins. He was confirmed by the Senate on March 1, 1905, and received his commission the same day. On December 31, 1911, the Circuit Courts were abolished and he thereafter served only on the Court of Appeals. He served until his death in 1915.

Personal life and family

Judge Seaman was a member of the Congregational church, the Knights Templar, the Ancient Free and Accepted Masons, and the Grand Army of the Republic.

He married Mary A. Peat on December 17, 1868.  They had one son and two daughters.

He died on March 8, 1915, while on vacation in Coronado, California with his daughter.

References

Sources
 
 

1842 births
1915 deaths
People from New Berlin, Wisconsin
Mayors of Sheboygan, Wisconsin
People of Wisconsin in the American Civil War
Wisconsin city council members
Judges of the United States District Court for the Eastern District of Wisconsin
Judges of the United States Court of Appeals for the Seventh Circuit
United States federal judges appointed by Grover Cleveland
19th-century American judges
United States court of appeals judges appointed by Theodore Roosevelt
20th-century American judges
United States Army soldiers
19th-century American politicians
United States federal judges admitted to the practice of law by reading law